Diamond willow is a type of tree with wood that is deformed into diamond-shaped segments with alternating colors. This is most likely the result of attack by a fungus (Valsa sordida and possibly others), which causes cankers to form in the wood in response to the infection. Diamond willow is prized by wood carvers and furniture makers for its strong contrasting colors (red and white) and its sculptural irregularity of shape. 

There are at least six different species that have been identified as being susceptible to diamonding, including Salix bebbiana, the most common diamond willow, plus S. pseudomonticola, S. arbusculoides, S. discolor, S. scouleriana, and S. alaxensis. 

The diamonding is usually found with a branch at its center or is found in the Y of a tree. Diamonding in willow does not seem to be specific to an area that willows grow in, and where one bunch of willow will have diamonds, the next clump of willows may have none at all. Although diamond willow is often thought of as being a northern phenomenon, of the boreal forest, there is mention of diamond willow growing as far south as Missouri.

Diamond formation and shape 
The tree grows diamond-shaped cankers in response to the fungus. The cankers seem to result from the tree growing away from the site of the attack. This usually happens at the crotch of a branch on a larger branch or main stem. If the branch is relatively small it seems to die very quickly. If the branch is larger, it may continue to grow and the diamond is formed on the branch and the stem. By growing away from the fungus, new layers of growth occur further and further  
away from the site of the fungal attack. Thus the affected area gets larger and deeper. If the tree has been affected in several places close together, then the diamonds run into each other. This can result in pronounced ridges if some sapwood continues to survive, or it may strangle the small ridge of sapwood, which then dies. 

The shape of the diamonds seems to vary from one clump of willow to the next, although there may be some general tendencies within a single species. Some stems will form long narrow diamonds; others will be short and wide. Usually, all the diamonds on the stems in one clump will have similar growth patterns. If the new layers of sapwood do not move back very much each year, then the diamonds will be deep bowl- or cleft-shaped. These stems will be able to survive longer than those whose diamonds are flat. The bark that is left over the top of the diamond changes quite markedly from the bark over the living sapwood. Depending on the species of willow, the living bark is usually smoother and slightly lighter in color. The bark over the diamond usually becomes rougher and somewhat darker. It also becomes tougher and adheres much more to the underlying wood. The sapwood is white to cream in color—again depending on the species, but also on the location. The heartwood is reddish-brown. This color tends to darken with exposure to light over a number of years.

If one stem in a clump of willow is affected, then all of them are likely to be. However, the neighboring clump may be complete without diamonds. Quaking Aspen (Populus tremuloides) has been known to bear depressions that resemble diamonding.

Notes

References 
 Carver's Companion

Wood
Fungal tree pathogens and diseases
Salix